opened in Fukuoka, Japan, in 1985. The collection focuses upon artists from Fukuoka Prefecture and Kyūshū more generally, and includes works by Koga Harue.

See also
 Fukuoka Art Museum
 List of Cultural Properties of Japan - paintings (Fukuoka)

References

External links
  Fukuoka Prefectural Museum of Art

Museums in Fukuoka Prefecture
Buildings and structures in Fukuoka
Art museums and galleries in Japan
Museums established in 1985
1985 establishments in Japan
Prefectural museums